Växjö BK is a Swedish football club located in Växjö in Kronoberg County.

Background
Växjö Bollklubb was formed on 20 January 1924 at a meeting at the Roséns café. Fotbollsföreningen Tigrarna had the previous year applied to join the Swedish Football Association but had been turned down because there was already a team from Stockholm with the same name. Therefore, it was decided that the club would be called Växjö BK. The club currently has around 1,700 members including an active youth section.

Since their foundation Växjö BK has participated mainly in the middle divisions of the Swedish football league system. The club reached its peak way back in 1936-37 when they played one season in Division 2 Södra, which at that time was the second tier of Swedish football. They play their home matches at the Sportfältet in Växjö.

Växjö BK are affiliated to Smålands Fotbollförbund.

Recent history
In recent seasons Växjö BK have competed in the following divisions:

2020 - Division IV, Småland Sydvästra
2019 - Division IV, Småland Sydvästra
2018 - Division IV, Småland Södra
2017 - Division IV, Småland Södra 
2016 - Division IV, Småland Sydvästra
2015 - Division IV, Småland Elit Östra
2014 - Division III, Sydöstra Götaland 
2013 - Division III, Sydöstra Götaland
2012 - Division IV, Småland Elit Östra
2011 - Division III, Sydöstra Götaland
2010 - Division III, Sydöstra Götaland
2009 - Division III, Sydöstra Götaland
2008 - Division IV, Småland Elit Västra
2007 - Division IV, Småland Elit Östra
2007 - Division IV, Småland Elit Södra
2006 - Division IV, Småland Elit Södra
2005 - Division III, Sydöstra Götaland
2004 - Division II, Östra Götaland
2003 - Division II, Östra Götaland
2002 - Division III, Sydöstra Götaland
2001 - Division III, Sydöstra Götaland
2000 - Division III, Sydöstra Götaland
1999 - Division III, Sydöstra Götaland
1998 - Division III, Sydöstra Götaland
1997 - Division III, Sydvästra Götaland
1996 - Division III, Sydöstra Götaland
1995 - Division III, Sydöstra Götaland
1994 - Division II, Östra Götaland
1993 - Division II, Östra Götaland

Attendances

In recent seasons Växjö BK have had the following average attendances:

The attendance record is 3,648 for a match against Öster at Värendsvallen which Växjö BK won 2-1.

Footnotes

External links 
 Växjö BK - Official website
 Växjö BK on Facebook

Sport in Växjö
Football clubs in Kronoberg County
Association football clubs established in 1924
1924 establishments in Sweden